Chaturmukha Basadi is a symmetrical Jain temple situated in Karkala, Karnataka, India. It is one of the most famous monuments in Karkala.

History
The Chaturmukha Basadi,  was built in the late 16th century by Immadi Bhairarasa Vodeya of the Santara dynasty in 1586.

About Temple
It has four symmetrical faces and is thus called chaturmukha (four faces) basadi (a term used to refer to Jain temples in South India). The temple has images of Tirthankara Aranath, Mallinath and Munisuvratnath. This basadi, completely made of carved granite rocks, is known as Tribhuvana Tilaka Jina Chaityalaya or Ratnatraya dhama from inscriptions. 

It faces the famous Karkala Bahubali statue  installed in the year 1432 by Veera Pandya of the Santara dynasty on February 13, 1432, on the instructions of the Bhattaraka of Karkala, Lalitakeerti.

Gallery

See also 
 Kere Basadi
 Saavira Kambada Basadi
 Gommateshwara statue

References

External links 
 History and Architecture of the Chaturmukha Basadi, Gerusoppa

Jain pilgrimage sites
Jain temples in Karnataka
15th-century Jain temples
Buildings and structures in Udupi district
1432 establishments